Anstead is a surname. Notable people with the surname include:

Ant Anstead, English television presenter
Harry Lee Anstead (born 1939), Justice of the Florida Supreme Court from 1994 to 2009
Nick Anstead, academic, currently a Politics lecturer at the University of East Anglia
Walter Anstead, English cricketer

See also
Anstead, Queensland, outer suburb of Brisbane, Australia, named after the original land owner John Anstead
Ansted (disambiguation)

English-language surnames